USS Elmasada (SP-109) was an armed motorboat that served in the United States Navy as a patrol vessel from 1917 to 1919.
 
Elmasada was built as a civilian motorboat in 1909 by Robert Jacobs at City Island, New York. In mid-May 1917 her owner, C.B. Fox of New Orleans, Louisiana, was ordered to turn her over to the U.S. Navy for use as a patrol boat during World War I. The Navy purchased her from Fox later in May and commissioned her on 4 June 1917 as USS Elmasada (SP-109).

Elmasada was attached to the 8th Naval District and employed in patrol and transport duties in the New Orleans area.

Elmasada was stricken from the Navy List on 20 May 1919 and transferred to the United States Lighthouse Service at New Orleans in June 1919.

Notes

References

Department of the Navy Naval Historical Center Online Library of Selected Images: U.S. Navy Ships: USS Elmasada (SP-109), 1917-1919. Originally the civilian motor boat Elmasada of 1909
NavSource Online: Section Patrol Craft Photo Archive: Elmasada (SP 109)

Patrol vessels of the United States Navy
World War I patrol vessels of the United States
Ships built in City Island, Bronx
1909 ships